Elsworth is a village and civil parish in South Cambridgeshire, England, 9 miles northwest of Cambridge and 7 miles southeast of Huntingdon. At the 2011 census, the population was 726.

It was one of only two sites in Cambridgeshire to be covered by the Survey of English Dialects.

History
The parish of Elsworth covers an area of 1,554 hectares to the north of the Cambridge to St Neots road. Its north-west border formed the border between Cambridgeshire and Huntingdonshire from the start of the 11th century until the two were merged in 1974. Its eastern border joins to the parish of Knapwell, formerly a dependent vill. At the end of the 13th century the parish also contained a hamlet called Grave, but this was not recorded as inhabited after 1349.

Elsworth was, during medieval times, one of the most populous villages in the neighbourhood. In 1086 it reported 44 peasant households, and 209 were listed at the time of the poll tax in 1377. Numbers declined over the next two centuries, before rising to around 500 people in the 17th century. Numbers grew more rapidly from the 1760s and fluctuated in the 19th century, reaching an all-time peak of 878 in 1841. Around 50 people emigrated to Australia and the United States in the 1850s.

Listed as Eleswurth in 974, and Elesuuorde in the Domesday Book of 1086, the name Elsworth means "Enclosure of a man called Eli".

Church
Elsworth has had a church under the patronage of Ramsey Abbey since at least the start of the 11th century. The present parish church of the Holy Trinity was built on the site of its predecessors in the 13th or 14th century, and the chancel and west tower date from this period. The tower contains four bells, three of which date from the 17th century.

The chancel contains some noted Perpendicular wooden stalls. Above the porch door is a sundial bearing the inscription "MOX NOX", and on the east gable is an attractive decorated cross.

Village life
Elsworth has a primary school and pre-school, as well as a recreation ground, a business park and a Post Office/shop.

There are two remaining pubs in the village. The George and Dragon at Cowdell End opened in the first half of the 19th century and was rebuilt after an 1880 fire. A restaurant was added in 1975. The Poacher – known as The Fox and Hounds until the late 20th century – has been open since the 18th century.

Elsworth has had recorded alehouses since at least the 14th century. By the late 18th century five were recorded, including the Fox and Hounds, the Plough, which closed in 1961, and the Three Horseshoes, which closed around 1915.

Elsworth also has a community shop, selling a range of groceries, cards and other items and run by volunteers from the village, a bi-monthly village newsletter, the Elsworth Times, and a biannual magazine, the Elsworth Chronicle.

The village has a cricket team which plays (2022) in the Cambridgeshire and Huntingdonshire Premier League CCA Junior League 5 West.

Elsworth also stages a village show each September. The show features competitions in many traditional categories such as baking and preserve making, as well as photography, art and other activities. The 2022 show will be the village's 64th annual show.

Notable people
The former Conservative Party Member of Parliament for South Cambridgeshire and former Interim Leader of the Change UK party, Heidi Allen, has lived in Elsworth with her husband since 2017. She joined the Liberal Democratic Party before later announcing that she would not stand again for Parliament at the election in December 2019.

Rev W Awdry (b. 15 June 1911, d. 21 March 1997) was the vicar of Elsworth church between 1946 and 1950. He is best known for writing the Railway Series of children's books, of which Thomas the Tank Engine is the most well known.

References

External links

Villages in Cambridgeshire
Civil parishes in Cambridgeshire
South Cambridgeshire District